Black Light Spiral is the debut album from Jack Dunning, aka Untold, released on his own label Hemlock records.

Composition 
Black Light Spiral is an unconventional record compositionally focused more on harsh horror atmospheres than consistent dance rhythms, summarized Larry Fitzmaurice: "the rhythms are wrapped in spikes, the melodies are built out of transistor-radio noise and abused vocal samples, and the empty space surrounding everything possesses a seasick unsteadiness." Crack Magazine described the entire LP as "one amorphous blur of mescaline loops and decayed rhythms, held together by the restless ghost of the UK's illustrious rave past."

Critical reception 

Crack Magazine praised Black Light Spiral for continuing Untold's "alchemic ability to distill storied influences into something that sounds like nothing you've ever heard before is still unparalleled." On the other hand, Fitzmaurice, while appreciating it as "a beguiling artistic statement of an album in a genre where finding success in the LP format isn't always a given," felt its abstractness may turn off fans of previous Untold material that had more "directly engaging qualities." Resident Advisor reviewer Andrew Ryce concluded that "the best aspect of the album is also the worst: it's alienating in way that might actually alienate you, and keep you from revisiting."

Track listing
 5 Wheels
 Drop It On the One
 Sing a Love Song
 Doubles
 Wet Wool
 Strange Dreams
 Hobthrust
 Ion

References

2014 debut albums
Untold (musician) albums